The Adventures of Batman is an animated television series produced by Lou Scheimer's Filmation studios. It showcased the 12-minute Batman segments from The Batman/Superman Hour, sometimes broken up by and surrounding another cartoon from Filmation's fast-growing stream of superhero stars. A re-branded 30-minute version premiered on CBS on September 14, 1968, as Batman with Robin the Boy Wonder. This version was repackaged without the Superman and Superboy segments.

Olan Soule was the voice of Batman and is most likely best remembered for his work on that show, and many others in the Filmation stable. Casey Kasem, notable for his voiceover and radio work, was the voice of Robin.

Batman and Robin would next appear in two The New Scooby-Doo Movies crossovers, various versions of Super Friends (featuring Soule and Kasem reprising their Batman and Robin roles, respectively) and The New Adventures of Batman in 1977.

Episodes

The Batman segment of The Batman/Superman Hour consisted of one story presented in two -minute segments and one story in a single -minute segment. 34 stories were produced (two-segment stories are listed first in each pairing):

The original villain Simon the Pieman makes a cameo appearance alongside Sweet Tooth in the Batman: The Brave and the Bold episode "A Bat Divided".

Home media
In 1985, Warner Home Video released five selected episodes of the series on VHS in the "Super Powers" video collection along with Aquaman, Superboy and Superman.

In 1993, in Australia only, Warner Home Video released a four-volume VHS collection with four stories per volume.

In 2008, episodes were released as digital downloads on iTunes, and streaming on Amazon Video.

On June 3, 2014, Warner Home Video (via DC Entertainment) released all 34 original, uncut broadcast episodes on DVD in Region 1 in a 2-disc set entitled The Adventures of Batman. (Note: The episode pairings and order differ from the above list.)

On September 17, 2021, the show was available on HBO Max in Latin America, in celebration for Batman Day.

On November 15, 2022, it was announced Warner Bros. Home Entertainment will release the series on Blu-ray on February 28, 2023.

References

External links
 
 
 Batman with Robin the Boy Wonder at Marks Cartoon Collections
 The Adventures of Batman at Batman Yesterday, Today, and Beyond
 The Adventures of Batman on The Big Cartoon Database.

1968 American television series debuts
1969 American television series endings
1960s American animated television series
CBS original programming
English-language television shows
Batman television series by Filmation
Animated television shows based on DC Comics
Television series by Warner Bros. Television Studios
American children's animated action television series
American children's animated adventure television series
American children's animated superhero television series
Television shows directed by Hal Sutherland